The following is a list of affiliates of Bounce TV, a digital terrestrial television network catering to an African American audience.

Bounce TV launched in September 2011 with an affiliate list buoyed by early carriage deals with stations owned or operated by Gray Television, and Nexstar Media Group. As of May 2017, Bounce TV covers over 74% of overall TV households and 79% of African American households.

Current affiliates
 1 Indicates station is a primary feed Bounce TV affiliate.

Former affiliates

References

External links
Affiliate map on BounceTV.com

Bounce TV